Marcin Bachleda (born 4 September 1982) is a Polish ski jumper.

He made his World Cup debut in February 2001 in Willingen, and collected his first World Cup points with a 28th place in January 2002 in Zakopane. He has placed once among the top fifteen, with an eleventh place from November 2002 in Kuusamo. He has won five Continental Cup races.

He competed at the World Championships in 1999, 2001, 2003 and 2005. He also finished ninth in the large hill at the 2005 Winter Universiade.

References

1982 births
Living people
Polish male ski jumpers
Universiade medalists in ski jumping
Sportspeople from Zakopane
Universiade silver medalists for Poland
Competitors at the 2005 Winter Universiade
Competitors at the 2009 Winter Universiade
21st-century Polish people